The 1980–81 Vancouver Canucks season was the team's 11th in the National Hockey League (NHL). They finished 3rd in the Smythe Division, scoring 289 goals and allowing 301.

Offseason

Regular season

Final standings

Schedule and results

Playoffs

Player statistics

Awards and records

Transactions

Draft picks
Vancouver's draft picks at the 1980 NHL Entry Draft held at the Montreal Forum in Montreal, Quebec.

Farm teams

See also
1980–81 NHL season

References

External links
http://www.hockey-reference.com/teams/VAN/1981.html

Vancouver Canucks seasons
Vancouver C
Vancouver